Honey, I Shrunk the Audience (known as MicroAdventure! in Tokyo Disneyland) was a 4D film spin-off of the Honey, I Shrunk the Kids film series that was shown at several Disney theme parks. The audience wore 3D glasses, and the gimbal-mounted theater would shake and rock, creating the illusion of moving along with the characters in the film.

History
In November 1993, Epcot announced that a new attraction themed after the Honey, I Shrunk the Kids movie franchise would be replacing Captain EO for the 1994 season. The new attraction would be called Honey, I Shrunk the Theater, a 3D film featuring special effects, such as vibrating chairs and water sprays. However, in February 1994, it was revealed that the name would be changed to Honey, I Shrunk the Audience. Captain EO closed on July 6, 1994 and work swiftly began on the new attraction. Honey, I Shrunk the Audience would open to the public later that year on November 21, 1994. The attraction was an instant hit and met with positive reception from guests.

Following the success of Honey, I Shrunk the Audience at Epcot, other Disney resort locations would follow suit. A similar installation opened three years later at Tokyo Disneyland called MicroAdventure! on April 15, 1997. It also replaced Captain EO which closed on September 1, 1996.

In early 1996, Disneyland announced they would be receiving their installation of Honey, I Shrunk The Audience. Like the other locations, it would also replace the park's Captain EO attraction that was set to close on April 7, 1997. After its closure, construction began on its replacement. Honey, I Shrunk the Audience officially opened at Disneyland on May 22, 1998, along with a remodeled Tomorrowland section of the park. 

On March 28, 1999, Honey, I Shrunk the Audience opened at Disneyland Paris. The attraction replaced Captain EO which closed on August 17, 1998. This location was also called Chérie, j'ai rétréci le public. The Epcot location received a new FASTPASS entrance a year later in 2000.

For the 2003 season, the attraction's pre-show was upgraded. This would involve replacing the original True Colors pre-show. The new version featured memory making and scenes covering the lives of families. These scenes included a child who couldn't find his dog and a frog causing mayhem on a wedding. Eric Idle would tell guests to follow the safety instructions at the end of the pre-show.

After Michael Jackson died on June 25, 2009, Captain EO regained popularity on the internet. In September, the Disneyland location was temporarily closed to allow Michael Jackson's family to watch Captain EO on private screenings. 

On December 18, 2009, it was announced that Captain EO would be coming back to Disneyland. This would mean that Honey, I Shrunk the Audience would be closing. The attraction would close at midnight on January 4, 2010. Honey, I Shrunk the Audience was stated to be closed temporarily for Captain EO, but it did not return. The Disneyland Paris location closed on May 3, 2010. This was followed by the Epcot location on May 9. Finally, the Tokyo Disneyland location closed for good on May 10. All four attractions were replaced by the Captain EO Tribute.

Synopsis
Viewers enter the Imagination Institute's theater for the Inventor of the Year Award Ceremony, in which professor Wayne Szalinski is receiving the award. Attendees are asked to don their "safety goggles" (3D glasses) in preparation for the scientific demonstrations. The show opens with the crew of the show searching for Wayne, when he suddenly flies on stage miniaturized and in a transportation device called a Hoverpod.

He accidentally drops the control box which sends him and the machine flying off behind the stage out of control. Then the show starts with Christie Smithers introducing Dr. Nigel Channing. Dr. Channing welcomes the audience and introduces Wayne. The Hoverpod comes back and destroys the neon "Inventor of the Year Award" sign over the audience (at first only some letters are knocked out, leaving "NERD" spelled diagonally). Dr. Channing attempts to introduce Diane, Wayne's wife, but she says that she has to go and help find Wayne. She takes Quark, the family's dog with her. Dr. Channing then introduces Wayne's sons, Nick and Adam. Nick, Wayne's oldest son, has a pet snake named Gigabyte around his neck, because he didn't want to leave him in their van. 

Nick then demonstrates his father's Dimensional Duplicator, a copy machine, to kill time while the crew searches for him. Wayne's youngest son, Adam, puts his pet mouse, Photon, in the copy machine and quickly multiplies into hundreds of copies. This does not go smoothly, and the audience ends up screaming with the loose mice running under their seats (which is really leg ticklers underneath the seats). To scare the mice away, Nick decides to use Wayne's Holo Pet Generator, which first takes the form of a cat, which then transforms into a lion, by accidentally giving the machine too much power, in the audience's faces. While the demonstrations go away, Wayne manages to use his shrinking machine to return himself back to normal size. He brings out the machine to demonstrate its uses by shrinking a family's luggage, saving space and money when traveling, hoping they will fit comfortably in the palm of his hand.

Unfortunately, the machine goes out of control and shrinks the audience (plus Nick, who pushes Dr. Channing out of the way of the machine's electrobeam). Wayne inspects Nick and the audience and, after making sure they're okay, says the machine blew a fuse. He says that he's got some spare parts in his office to fix the machine (or so he hopes). Diane enters the room asking Wayne if everything is ok. Wayne responds with, "Honey, I shrunk the audience!" Diane then asks where's Nick. Nick alerts his position to his mother. 

The viewers are then intimidated by Wayne's wife, Diane as she desperately begins to walk towards her tiny shrunken son and the tiny shrunken audiences with the ground rumbling under her feet. She begins to bend over to quietly and ominously towards Nick who is like a tiny walking toy figure asking for help which made her faint out of shock upon on seeing how tiny Nick and the audiences are now. Diane's terrifying fainting heavy body falls towards Nick who luckily escaped into being nearly crushed under her overwhelmingly massive weight. The impact of her fall on the floor caused the ground to jerk violently due to Diane's enormous size and mass from the point of view of the shrunken Nick and the audience (This triggered the seats to shake as well which really simulates of being small and how heavy Diane really is compared to the audience). Adam takes a picture of them with a blinding flash and picks up the whole theater so he can "show the little people to Mommy." The whole room is lifted right off its construction for a minute or two as Adam walks around showing the other regular size people a better view of the tiny Nick and the audiences. After showing it around, the shrunken audience's view then pans around towards a curious female intern (who also looks like a giant from their perspective) with a binocular who bends down towards the tiny shrunken Nick and the tiny shrunken audiences while giving an exclamation of amazement towards the tiny Nick and the audiences, interested and surprised at just how tiny Nick along with the audiences are, before Diane (who regained consciousness) and Channing persuade Adam to put the theater back where he found it. Then Gigabyte, much larger than the miniature audience, nearly eats them (as he had not yet been fed that day). Quark then chases him away with a few barks. Luckily, Wayne fixes the machine just in the nick of time and returns the audience and Nick back to normal size, but Quark is momentarily affected by the beam and then runs backstage out of sight.

Wayne accepts his award and begins his speech, but he is interrupted by Nick warning of a "big, humongous problem." Diane then says, "Wayne, you didn't!" He then responds with, "Honey, I did! I blew up the dog!" The now giant Quark walks out onto the stage and the curtain closes while viewers hear the Imagination Institute's crew trying to stop him from crushing the place. He then finds his way through the curtain and sneezes on the audience for the finale (which triggers hidden water sprayers in the back of the seats), closing the show. Diane then says, "Bad boy Quark! You know better than that!" As they leave, the audience can hear the commotion from backstage continue.

Additional information
 The show was sponsored by Kodak.
 The film movie was directed by Randal Kleiser, who directed the franchise's 1992 release Honey, I Blew Up the Kid along with several classic films such as Grease, The Blue Lagoon, and Disney's Flight of the Navigator.
 The movie was presented in 3D by using polarized glasses and projectors.
 The entire audience was on a platform that moved up to four inches high during the presentation to simulate the theater moving and the floor shaking (when Adam Szalinski picks it up).
The song "True Colors" was played as part of the original pre-show film as an advertisement for Kodak. In Disneyland & Epcot, the song is sung by various artists, one of which is Luther Vandross. In the Disneyland Paris version, it is sung by Cyndi Lauper.

Cast and crew

Cast
 Rick Moranis as Wayne Szalinski
 Marcia Strassman as Diane Szalinski
 Robert Oliveri as Nick Szalinski
 Daniel & Joshua Shalikar as Adam Szalinski
 Eric Idle as Dr. Nigel Channing
 Katherine LaNasa as Reporter (pre-show)
 Meadow Sisto as Christie Smithers

Crew
Directed by Randal Kleiser
Written by Bill Prady, Steve Spiegel
Produced by Thomas G. Smith
Co-producer – Steven Keller
Production designer – Leslie Dilley
Director of photography – Dean Cundey
Visual effects – Eric Brevig
Original score – Bruce Broughton

See also
Epcot attraction and entertainment history
List of former Disneyland attractions
List of 3D films

References

External links
 
 Bruce Broughton's Website

Former Walt Disney Parks and Resorts attractions
1994 films
1990s 3D films
Walt Disney Parks and Resorts films
Tomorrowland
Amusement rides based on film franchises
Imagination! (Epcot pavilion)
3D short films
Films directed by Randal Kleiser
Fiction about size change
Honey, I Shrunk the Kids (franchise)
Kodak sponsorships
1994 establishments in Florida
2010 disestablishments in Florida
1998 establishments in California
2010 disestablishments in California
1997 establishments in Japan
1999 establishments in France
2010 disestablishments in Japan
2010 disestablishments in France